Patrick Banor is a Ghanaian politician and an administrator. He has been the member of parliament for the Asutifi North constituency since 7 January 2021.

Early life and education 
Banor was born on Friday 13 June 1975 at Kenyasi No.2. He obtained he Basic Education Certificate in 1991, and his Secondary School Certificate in 1994. He was awarded his Bachelor of Arts degree in Sociology and Social Work in 2009.

Career and politics 
Prior to entering politics, he was the General Manager of Sarfpok Company Limited. During the 2020 NPP parliamentary primaries, Banor contested for the Asutifi North seat against Evans Bobie Opoku and won. During the 2020 Ghanaian general election, Banor contested for the Asutifi North seat with Ebenezer Kwaku Addo of the NDC, and Kofi Annan of GUM. He polled 18505 votes representing 52.62% of the total valid votes cast against Addo's 16546 votes and Anane's 116 votes, representing 47.05% and 0.33% of the total valid votes cast respectively.

Committee 
Patrick is a member of the Subsidiary Legislation Committee and also a member of the House committee.

Personal life 
Patrick is a Christian.

Philanthropy 
In September 2020,  Patrick provided 1,348 candidates of BECE with mathematical sets.

In August 2021, he presented about 400 desks to Ola Girls' SHS.

References 

Ghanaian MPs 2021–2025
Living people
1975 births
New Patriotic Party politicians